Boultbee  may refer to:

Alfred Boultbee (1828–1901), Canadian politician
John Boultbee (artist) (1753–1812)
John Boultbee (explorer) (1759–1854)
John Boultbee (sport administrator) (born 1950), Australian sports administrator
Thomas Pownall Boultbee (1818–1884), English clergyman
Gardner Boultbee (1907–1980), Canadian sailor